Anthocoris limbatus  is a Palearctic species of  true bug It is predatory.

References

External links
 Ecology of Commanster

Anthocoridae
Hemiptera of Europe
Insects described in 1836